The National Prize for Humanities and Social Sciences was created in Chile in 1992 under Law 19169. It is granted "to the humanist, scientist, or academic, who has distinguished himself for his contribution in the field of Human Sciences" (Article 8 of the aforementioned law). The history field has its own National Award.

The prize, which is awarded every two years, consists of a diploma, the sum of 6,576,457 pesos which is adjusted every year, according to the previous year's consumer price index, and a pension of 20  (approximately US$1,600).

It is part of the National Prize of Chile, awarded by the President of the Republic.

Winners
 1993,  (philosophy)
 1995, Aníbal Pinto Santa Cruz (economics)
 1997,  (law and philosophy)
 1999, Humberto Giannini (philosophy)
 2001,  (law)
 2003, José Zalaquett (law)
 2005, Ricardo Ffrench-Davis (economics)
 2007, Manuel Antonio Garretón (sociology)
 2009, Agustín Squella (law and journalism)
 2011, Carla Cordua and Roberto Torretti (philosophy)
 2013, Sonia Montecino (anthropology)
 2015, Tomás Moulian (sociology)
 2017,  (psychology)

See also

 List of social sciences awards
 List of psychology awards

References

1992 establishments in Chile
Awards established in 1992
Chilean awards
Humanities awards
Social sciences awards
1992 in Chilean law